"The List of Generals" is a song written by New York music hall performer and songwriter Joe English in 1864.  The song was written to praise the commanders in the Union Army during the American Civil War. It is sung to the melody of "Doran's Ass."  The song is known for its praise of generals, several of whom were not effective leaders. Most notably it praises George B. McClellan, a popular leader but a poor strategist, and demands he be restored to command of the Union Army.

There are two recorded versions of the song. One can be found on the album The Irish Volunteer.

There is another version of this song which can be found and is played for the closing credits of "Civil War Minutes - Union Volume 1". This can be found in Amazon Prime.

List of Generals praised in the song 
 Major General Benjamin Franklin Butler
 Major General George Meade
 Major General William Rosecrans
 Major General Franz Sigel
 Major General John Adams Dix
 Major General Nathaniel P. Banks
 Major General Ambrose Burnside
 Major General William Tecumseh Sherman
 Brigadier General Thomas Francis Meagher
 Brigadier General Michael Corcoran
 Major General Daniel Sickles
 Lieutenant General Ulysses S. Grant
 Major General George B. McClellan

References

Songs of the American Civil War
Vaudeville songs
1864 songs